Attorney General Sutton may refer to:

Nicholas Sutton (lawyer) (1440s–1478), Attorney General for Ireland
William Sutton (lawyer) ( 1410–1480), Attorney General for Ireland

See also
General Sutton (disambiguation)